

John Clinton Porter (April 4, 1871 – May 27, 1959) was a U.S. political figure. The Los Angeles Times wrote that he represented a "unique mixture of reform politics and xenophobic Protestant populism [that] took him quite literally from the junk yard to City Hall." Porter was a member of the Ku Klux Klan during its popular resurgence in the early 1920s.

Biography
He was born on April 4, 1871, in Leon, Iowa to Reverend Josephus Clinton Porter and Mathilda Catherine Gardner. 

He served as the 33rd mayor of Los Angeles between 1929 and 1933 when he replaced George Edward Cryer. He survived a recall election in 1932.

He ran for re-election twice more but was defeated in 1933 by Frank L. Shaw and in 1941 by Fletcher Bowron. 

He died of a heart and lung condition in Los Angeles, California on May 27, 1959. He was buried at Forest Lawn Memorial Park in the Hollywood Hills.

Further reading
Chronological Record of Los Angeles City Officials: 1850—1938, Compiled under Direction of Municipal Reference Library City Hall, Los Angeles March 1938 (Reprinted 1966)

External links

References

1871 births
1959 deaths
Mayors of Los Angeles
People from Leon, Iowa
American Ku Klux Klan members
Burials at Forest Lawn Memorial Park (Hollywood Hills)
California Democrats
Ku Klux Klan in California